Condylorrhiza oculatalis is a moth in the family Crambidae. It was described by Heinrich Benno Möschler in 1890. It can be found in Puerto Rico and Cuba.

References

Moths described in 1890
Spilomelinae